Space medicine is the practice of medicine on astronauts in outer space whereas astronautical hygiene is the application of science and technology to the prevention or control of exposure to the hazards that may cause astronaut ill health.  Both these sciences work together to ensure that astronauts work in a safe environment. The main objective is to discover how well and for how long people can survive the extreme conditions in space, and how fast they can adapt to the Earth's environment after returning from their voyage.  Medical consequences such as possible blindness and bone loss have been associated with human spaceflight.

In October 2015, the NASA Office of Inspector General issued a health hazards report related to space exploration, including a human mission to Mars.

History 
Hubertus Strughold (1898–1987), a former Nazi physician and physiologist, was brought to the United States after World War II as part of Operation Paperclip. He first coined the term "space medicine" in 1948 and was the first and only Professor of Space Medicine at the School of Aviation Medicine (SAM) at Randolph Air Force Base, Texas. In 1949, Strughold was made director of the Department of Space Medicine at the SAM (which is now the US Air Force School of Aerospace Medicine (USAFSAM) at Wright-Patterson Air Force Base, Ohio. He played an important role in developing the pressure suit worn by early American astronauts. He was a co-founder of the Space Medicine Branch of the Aerospace Medical Association in 1950. The aeromedical library at Brooks AFB was named after him in 1977, but later renamed because documents from the Nuremberg War Crimes Tribunal linked Strughold to medical experiments in which inmates of the Dachau concentration camp were tortured and killed.

Soviet research into Space Medicine was centered at the Scientific Research Testing Institute of Aviation Medicine (NIIAM).  In 1949, A.M. Vasilevsky, the Minister of Defense of the USSR, gave instructions via the initiative of Sergei Korolev to NIIAM to conduct biological and medical research. In 1951, NIIAM began to work on the first research work entitled "Physiological and hygienic substantiation of flight capabilities in special conditions", which formulated the main research tasks, the necessary requirements for pressurized cabins, life support systems, rescue and control and recording equipment. At the Korolev design bureau, they created rockets for lifting animals within 200–250 km and 500–600 km, and then began to talk about developing artificial satellites and launching a man into space.  Then in 1963 the Institute for Biomedical Problems (IMBP) was founded to undertake the study of space medicine.

Animal testing 

Before sending humans, space agencies used animals to study the effects of space travel on the body. After several years of failed animal recoveries, an Aerobee rocket launch in September 1951 was the first safe return of a monkey and a group of mice from near space altitudes. On 3 November 1957, Sputnik 2 became the first mission to carry a living animal to space, a dog named Laika. This flight and others suggested the possibility of safely flying in space within a controlled environment, and provided data on how living beings react to space flight. Later flights with cameras to observe the animal subjects would show in flight conditions such as high-G and zero-G. Russian tests yielded more valuable physiological data from the animal tests.

On January 31, 1961, a chimpanzee named Ham was launched into a sub-orbital flight aboard a Mercury-Redstone Launch Vehicle. The flight was meant to model the planned mission of astronaut Alan Shepard. The mission planned to reach an altitude of 115 miles, and speeds up to 4400 miles per hour. However, the actual flight reached 157 miles and a maximum speed of 5857 miles per hour. During flight, Ham experienced 6.6 minutes of weightlessness. After splashing down in the Atlantic Ocean, Ham was recovered by the USS Donner. He suffered only limited injuries during flight, only receiving a bruised nose. Ham's vital signs were monitored and collected throughout the 16 minute flight, and used to develop life support systems for later human astronauts.

Animal testing in space continues currently, with mice, ants, and other animals regularly being sent to the International Space Station. In 2014, eight ant colonies were sent to the ISS to investigate the group behavior of ants in microgravity. The ISS allows for the investigation of animal behavior without sending them in specifically designed capsules.

North American X-15 

Rocket-powered aircraft North American X-15 provided an early opportunity to study the effects of a near-space environment on human physiology. At its highest operational speed and altitude, the X-15 provided approximately five minutes of weightlessness. This opportunity allowed for the development of devices to facilitate working in low pressure, high acceleration environments such as pressure suits, and telemetering systems to collect physiological data. This data and technologies allowed for better mission planning for future space missions.

Project Mercury 

Space medicine was a critical factor in the United States human space program, starting with Project Mercury. The main precaution taken by Mercury astronauts to defend against high G environments like launch and reentry was a couch with seat belts to make sure astronauts were not forcibly moved from their position. Additionally, experienced pilots proved to be better able to cope with high G scenarios. One of the pressing concerns with Project Mercury's mission environment was the isolated nature of the cabin. There were deeper concerns about psychological issues than there were about physiological health effects. Substantial animal testing proved beyond a reasonable doubt to NASA engineers that spaceflight could be done safely provided a climate controlled environment.

Project Gemini 
The Gemini program primarily addressed the psychological issues from isolation in space with two crewmembers. Upon returning from space, it was recorded that crewmembers experienced a loss of balance and a decrease in anaerobic ability.

Project Apollo 
The Apollo program began with a substantial basis of medical knowledge and precautions from both Mercury and Gemini. The understanding of high and low G environments was well documented and the effects of isolation had been addressed with Gemini and Apollo having multiple occupants in one capsule. The primary research of the Apollo Program focused on pre-flight and post-flight monitoring. Some Apollo mission plans were postponed or altered due to some or all crewmembers contracting a communicable disease. Apollo 14 instituted a form of quarantine for crewmembers so as to curb the passing of typical illnesses. While the efficacy of the Flight Crew Health Stabilization Program was questionable as some crewmembers still contracted diseases, the program showed enough results to maintain implementation with current space programs.

Effects of space-travel 

In October 2018, NASA-funded researchers found that lengthy journeys into outer space, including travel to the planet Mars, may substantially damage the  gastrointestinal tissues of astronauts. The studies support earlier work that found such journeys could significantly damage the brains of astronauts, and age them prematurely.

In November 2019, researchers reported that astronauts experienced serious blood flow and clot problems while on board the International Space Station, based on a six-month study of 11 healthy astronauts. The results may influence long-term spaceflight, including a mission to the planet Mars, according to the researchers.

Cardiac rhythms 

Heart rhythm disturbances have been seen among astronauts. Most of these have been related to cardiovascular disease, but it is not clear whether this was due to pre-existing conditions or effects of space flight. It is hoped that advanced screening for coronary disease has greatly mitigated this risk. Other heart rhythm problems, such as atrial fibrillation, can develop over time, necessitating periodic screening of crewmembers’ heart rhythms. Beyond these terrestrial heart risks, some concern exists that prolonged exposure to microgravity may lead to heart rhythm disturbances. Although this has not been observed to date, further surveillance is warranted.

Decompression illness in spaceflight 
In space, astronauts use a space suit, essentially a self-contained individual spacecraft, to do spacewalks, or extra-vehicular activities (EVAs). Spacesuits are generally inflated with 100% oxygen at a total pressure that is less than a third of normal atmospheric pressure.  Eliminating inert atmospheric components such as nitrogen allows the astronaut to breathe comfortably, but also have the mobility to use their hands, arms, and legs to complete required work, which would be more difficult in a higher pressure suit.

After the astronaut dons the spacesuit, air is replaced by 100% oxygen in a process called a "nitrogen purge". In order to reduce the risk of decompression sickness, the astronaut must spend several hours "pre-breathing" at an intermediate nitrogen partial pressure, in order to let their body tissues outgas nitrogen slowly enough that bubbles are not formed. When the astronaut returns to the "shirt sleeve" environment of the spacecraft after an EVA, pressure is restored to whatever the operating pressure of that spacecraft may be, generally normal atmospheric pressure. Decompression illness in spaceflight consists of decompression sickness (DCS) and other injuries due to uncompensated changes in pressure, or barotrauma.

Decompression sickness 
Decompression sickness is the injury to the tissues of the body resulting from the presence of nitrogen bubbles in the tissues and blood. This occurs due to a rapid reduction in ambient pressure causing the dissolved nitrogen to come out of solution as gas bubbles within the body. In space the risk of DCS is significantly reduced by using a technique to wash out the nitrogen in the body's tissues. This is achieved by breathing 100% oxygen for a specified period of time before donning the spacesuit, and is continued after a nitrogen purge. DCS may result from inadequate or interrupted pre-oxygenation time, or other factors including the astronaut's level of hydration, physical conditioning, prior injuries and age. Other risks of DCS include inadequate nitrogen purge in the EMU, a strenuous or excessively prolonged EVA, or a loss of suit pressure. Non-EVA crewmembers may also be at risk for DCS if there is a loss of spacecraft cabin pressure.

Symptoms of DCS in space may include chest pain, shortness of breath, cough or pain with a deep breath, unusual fatigue, lightheadedness, dizziness, headache, unexplained musculoskeletal pain, tingling or numbness, extremities weakness, or visual abnormalities.

Primary treatment principles consist of in-suit repressurization to re-dissolve nitrogen bubbles, 100% oxygen to re-oxygenate tissues, and hydration to improve the circulation to injured tissues.

Barotrauma 
Barotrauma is the injury to the tissues of air filled spaces in the body as a result of differences in pressure between the body spaces and the ambient atmospheric pressure. Air filled spaces include the middle ears, paranasal sinuses, lungs and gastrointestinal tract. One would be predisposed by a pre-existing upper respiratory infection, nasal allergies, recurrent changing pressures, dehydration, or a poor equalizing technique.

Positive pressure in the air filled spaces results from reduced barometric pressure during the depressurization phase of an EVA. It can cause abdominal distension, ear or sinus pain, decreased hearing, and dental or jaw pain. Abdominal distension can be treated with extending the abdomen, gentle massage and encourage passing flatus. Ear and sinus pressure can be relieved with passive release of positive pressure. Pretreatment for susceptible individuals can include oral and nasal decongestants, or oral and nasal steroids.

Negative pressure in air fill spaces results from increased barometric pressure during repressurization after an EVA or following a planned restoration of a reduced cabin pressure. Common symptoms include ear or sinus pain, decreased hearing, and tooth or jaw pain.

Treatment may include active positive pressure equalization of ears and sinuses, oral and nasal decongestants, or oral and nasal steroids, and appropriate pain medication if needed.

Decreased immune system functioning 
Astronauts in space have weakened immune systems, which means that in addition to increased vulnerability to new exposures, viruses already present in the body—which would normally be suppressed—become active. In space, T-cells do not reproduce properly, and the cells that do exist are less able to
fight off infection. NASA research is measuring the change in the immune systems of its astronauts as well as performing experiments with T-cells in space.

On April 29, 2013, scientists in Rensselaer Polytechnic Institute, funded by NASA, reported that, during spaceflight on the International Space Station, microbes seem to adapt to the space environment in ways "not observed on Earth" and in ways that "can lead to increases in growth and virulence".

In March 2019, NASA reported that latent viruses in humans may be activated during space missions, adding possibly more risk to astronauts in future deep-space missions.

Increased infection risk 

A 2006 Space Shuttle experiment found that Salmonella typhimurium, a bacterium that can cause food poisoning, became more virulent when cultivated in space. On April 29, 2013, scientists in Rensselaer Polytechnic Institute, funded by NASA, reported that, during spaceflight on the International Space Station, microbes seem to adapt to the space environment in ways "not observed on Earth" and in ways that "can lead to increases in growth and virulence". More recently, in 2017, bacteria were found to be more resistant to antibiotics and to thrive in the near-weightlessness of space. Microorganisms have been observed to survive the vacuum of outer space. Researchers in 2018 reported, after detecting the presence on the International Space Station (ISS) of five Enterobacter bugandensis bacterial strains, none pathogenic to humans, that microorganisms on ISS should be carefully monitored to continue assuring a medically healthy environment for astronauts.

Effects of fatigue 

Human spaceflight often requires astronaut crews to endure long periods without rest.   Studies have shown that lack of sleep can cause fatigue that leads to errors while performing critical tasks.  Also, individuals who are fatigued often cannot determine the degree of their impairment.
Astronauts and ground crews frequently suffer from the effects of sleep deprivation and circadian rhythm disruption.  Fatigue due to sleep loss, sleep shifting and work overload could cause performance errors that put space flight participants at risk of compromising mission objectives as well as the health and safety of those on board.

Loss of balance 
Leaving and returning to Earth's gravity causes “space sickness,” dizziness, and loss of balance in astronauts. By studying how changes can affect balance in the human body—involving the senses, the brain, the inner ear, and blood pressure—NASA hopes to develop treatments that can be used on Earth and in space to correct balance disorders. Until then, NASA's astronauts must rely on a medication called Midodrine (an “anti-dizzy” pill that temporarily increases blood pressure), and/or promethazine to help carry out the tasks they need to do to return home safely.

Loss of bone density 
Spaceflight osteopenia is the bone loss associated with human spaceflight. The metabolism of calcium is limited in microgravity and will cause calcium to leak out of bones. After a 3–4 month trip into space, it takes about 2–3 years to regain lost bone density. New techniques are being developed to help astronauts recover faster. Research in the following areas holds the potential to aid the process of growing new bone:
 Diet and Exercise changes may reduce osteoporosis.
 Vibration Therapy  may stimulate bone growth.
 Medication could trigger the body to produce more of the protein responsible for bone growth and formation.

Loss of muscle mass 

In space, muscles in the legs, back, spine, and heart weaken and waste away because they no longer are needed to overcome gravity, just as people lose muscle when they age due to reduced physical activity. Astronauts rely on research in the following areas to build muscle and maintain body mass:
 Exercise may build muscle if at least two hours a day is spent doing resistance training routines.
 Hormone supplements (hGH) may be a way to tap into the body's natural growth signals.
 Medication may trigger the body into producing muscle growth proteins.
 Neuromuscular Electrical Stimulation as a method to prevent muscle atrophy.

Loss of eyesight 

After long space flight missions, astronauts may experience severe eyesight problems. Such eyesight problems may be a major concern for future deep space flight missions, including a human mission to Mars.

Loss of mental abilities and risk of Alzheimer's disease 

On December 31, 2012, a NASA-supported study reported that human spaceflight may harm the brain of astronauts and accelerate the onset of Alzheimer's disease.

On 2 November 2017, scientists reported that significant changes in the position and structure of the brain have been found in astronauts who have taken trips in space, based on MRI studies. Astronauts who took longer space trips were associated with greater brain changes.

Orthostatic intolerance 

"Under the effects of the earth's gravity, blood and other body fluids are pulled towards the lower body. When gravity is taken away or reduced during space exploration, the blood tends to collect in the upper body instead, resulting in facial edema and other unwelcome side effects. Upon return to earth, the blood begins to pool in the lower extremities again, resulting in orthostatic hypotension."

In space, astronauts lose fluid volume—including up to 22% of their blood volume. Because it has
less blood to pump, the heart will atrophy. A weakened heart results in low blood pressure
and can produce a problem with “orthostatic tolerance,” or the body's ability to send enough
oxygen to the brain without fainting or becoming dizzy.

Radiation effects 

Soviet cosmonaut Valentin Lebedev, who spent 211 days in orbit during 1982 (an absolute record for  stay in Earth's orbit), lost his eyesight to progressive cataract. Lebedev stated: “I suffered from a lot of radiation in space. It was all concealed back then, during the Soviet years, but now I can say that I caused damage to my health because of that flight.” On 31 May 2013, NASA scientists reported that a possible human mission to Mars may involve a great radiation risk based on the amount of energetic particle radiation detected by the RAD on the Mars Science Laboratory while traveling from the Earth to Mars in 2011–2012.

Sleep disorders 

Fifty percent of space shuttle astronauts take sleeping pills and still get two hours or less of sleep. NASA is researching two areas which may provide the keys to a better night's sleep, as
improved sleep decreases fatigue and increases daytime productivity.  A variety of methods for combating this phenomenon are constantly under discussion.  A partial list of remedies would include:
 Go to sleep at the same time each night. With practice, you will (almost) always be tired and ready for sleep.
  Melatonin, once thought to be an anti-aging wonder drug (this was due to the well-documented observation that as people age they gradually produce less and less of the hormone naturally). The amount of melatonin the body produces decreases linearly over a lifetime. Although the melatonin anti-aging fad was thoroughly debunked following a large number of randomized trials, it was soon in the spotlight once more due to the observation that a healthy person's normal melatonin levels varies widely throughout each day: usually, levels rise in the evening and fall in the morning. Ever since the discovery that melatonin levels are highest at bedtime, melatonin has been purported by some to be an effective sleep-aid – it is especially popular for jet-lag. Melatonin's efficacy in treating insomnia is hotly debated and therefore in the US it is sold as a dietary supplement. "These statements have not been evaluated by the FDA" is printed on the packaging even though melatonin has been studied very extensively.
 Ramelteon, a melatonin receptor agonist, is a relatively new drug designed by using the melatonin molecule and the shapes of melatonin receptors as starting points.  Ramelteon binds to the same M1 and M2 receptors in the suprachiasmatic nucleus (the "biological clock" in the brain) as melatonin (M1 and M2 get their names from melatonin). It also may derive some of its properties from its three-times greater elimination half-life.  Ramelteon is not without detractors who claim that it is no more effective than melatonin, and melatonin is less expensive by orders of magnitude.  It is unclear whether Ramelteon causes its receptors to behave differently than they do when bound to melatonin, and Ramelteon may have a significantly greater affinity for these receptors.  Better information on Ramelteon's effectiveness should be available soon, and despite questions of its efficacy, the general lack of side effects makes Ramelteon one of the very few sleep medications that could potentially be safely used by astronauts.
 Barbiturates and Benzodiazepines are both very strong sedatives.  While they certainly would work (at least short term) in helping astronauts sleep, they have side effects that could affect the astronaut's ability to perform his/her job, especially in the "morning."  This side effect renders barbiturates and benzodiazepines likely unfit as treatments for space insomnia.  Narcotics and most tranquilizers also fall into this category.
 Zolpidem and Zopiclone are sedative-hypnotics, better known by their trade names "Ambien" and "Lunesta".  These are extremely popular sleep-aids, due in large part to their effectiveness and significantly reduced side-effect profiles vis-a-vis benzodiazepines and barbiturates.  Although other drugs may be more effective in inducing sleep Zolpidem and Zopiclone essentially lack the sorts of side effects that disqualify other insomnia drugs for astronauts, for whom being able to wake up easily and quickly can be of paramount importance; astronauts who are not thinking clearly, are groggy, and are disoriented when a sudden emergency wakes them could end up trading their grogginess for the indifference of death in seconds.  Zolpidem, Zopiclone, and the like – in most people – are significantly less likely to cause drug-related daytime sleepiness, nor excessive drowsiness if woken abruptly.
 Practice good sleep hygiene. In other words, the bed is for sleeping only; get out of bed within a few moments of waking up.  Do not sit in bed watching TV or using a laptop.  When one is acclimated to spending many hours awake in bed, it can disrupt the body's natural set of daily cycles, called the circadian rhythm.  While this is less of an issue for astronauts who have very limited entertainment options in their sleeping areas, another aspect of sleep hygiene is adhering to a specific pre-sleep routine (shower, brush teeth, fold up clothing, or spend 20 minutes reading a novel, for example); observing this sort of routine regularly can significantly improve one's sleep quality.  Of course, sleep hygiene studies have all been conducted at 1G, but it seems possible (if not likely) that observing sleep hygiene would retain at least some efficacy in micro-gravity.
 Modafinil is a drug that is prescribed for narcolepsy and other disorders that involve excessive daytime exhaustion.  It has been approved in various military situations and for astronauts thanks to its ability to stave off fatigue.  It is unclear whether astronauts sometimes use the drug because they are sleep-deprived – it might only be used on spacewalks and in other high-risk situations.
 Dexedrine is an amphetamine which used to be the gold-standard for fighter pilots flying long and multiple sorties in a row, and therefore may have at some point been available if astronauts were in need of a strong stimulant. Today, Modafinil has largely – if not entirely – replaced Dexedrine; reaction time and reasoning among pilots who are sleep-deprived and on Dexedrine suffer, and get worse the longer the pilot stays awake.   In one study, helicopter pilots that were given two-hundred milligrams of Modafinil every three hours were able to significantly improve their flight-simulator performance. The study reported, however, that modafinil was not as efficacious as dexamphetamine in increasing performance without producing side effects.

Spaceflight analogues 
Biomedical research in space is expensive and logistically and technically complicated, and thus limited. Conducting medical research in space alone will not provide humans with the depth of knowledge needed to ensure the safety of inter-planetary travellers. Complementary to research in space is the use of spaceflight analogues. Analogues are particularly useful for the study of immunity, sleep, psychological factors, human performance, habitability, and telemedicine. Examples of spaceflight analogues include confinement chambers (Mars-500), sub-aqua habitats (NEEMO), and Antarctic (Concordia Station) and Arctic FMARS and (Haughton–Mars Project) stations.

Space medicine careers

Related degrees, areas of specialization, and certifications 
 Aeromedical certification
 Aerospace medicine
 Aerospace studies
 Occupational and preventive medicine
 Global Health 
 Public Health 
 Disaster medicine
 Prehospital medicine
 Wilderness and extreme medicine

Space nursing 
Space nursing is the nursing speciality that studies how space travel impacts human response patterns.  Similar to space medicine, the speciality also contributes to knowledge about nursing care of earthbound patients.

Medicine in flight

Ultrasound and space 

Ultrasound is the main diagnostic imaging tool on ISS and for the foreseeable future missions.  X-rays and CT scans involve radiation which is unacceptable in the space environment.  Though MRI uses magnetics to create images, it is too large at present to consider as a viable option.  Ultrasound, which uses sound waves to create images and comes in laptop size packages, provides imaging of a wide variety of tissues and organs.  It is currently being used to look at the eyeball and the optic nerve to help determine the cause(s) of changes that NASA has noted mostly in long duration astronauts.  NASA is also pushing the limits of ultrasound use regarding musculoskeletal problems as these are some of the most common and most likely problems to occur.  Significant challenges to using ultrasounds on space missions is training the astronaut to use the equipment (ultrasound technicians spend years in training and developing the skills necessary to be "good" at their job) as well as interpreting the images that are captured.  Much of ultrasound interpretation is done real-time but it is impractical to train astronauts to actually read/interpret ultrasounds.  Thus, the data is currently being sent back to mission control and forwarded to medical personnel to read and interpret.  Future exploration class missions will need to be autonomous due to transmission times taking too long for urgent/emergent medical conditions.  The ability to be autonomous, or to use other equipment such as MRIs, is currently being researched.

Space Shuttle era 

With the additional lifting capability presented by the Space Shuttle program, NASA designers were able to create a more comprehensive medical readiness kit.  The SOMS consists of two separate packages: the Medications and Bandage Kit (MBK) and the Emergency Medical Kit (EMK). While the MBK contained capsulate medications (tablets, capsules, and suppositories), bandage materials, and topical medication, the EMK had medications to be administered by injection, items for performing minor surgeries, diagnostic/therapeutic items, and a microbiological test kit.

John Glenn, the first American astronaut to orbit the Earth, returned with much fanfare to space once again on STS-95 at 77 years of age to confront the physiological challenges preventing long-term space travel for astronauts—loss of bone density, loss of muscle mass, balance disorders, sleep disturbances, cardiovascular changes, and immune system depression—all of which are problems confronting aging people as well as astronauts.

Future investigations

Feasibility of Long Duration Space Flights 

In the interest of creating the possibility of longer duration space flight, NASA has invested in the research and application of preventative space medicine, not only for medically preventable pathologies but trauma as well. Although trauma constitutes more of a life-threatening situation, medically preventable pathologies pose more of a threat to astronauts. "The involved crewmember is endangered because of mission stress and the lack of complete treatment capabilities on board the spacecraft, which could result in the manifestation of more severe symptoms than those usually associated with the same disease in the terrestrial environment. Also, the situation is potentially hazardous for the other crewmembers because the small, closed, ecological system of the spacecraft is conducive to disease transmission. Even if the disease is not transmitted, the safety of the other crewmembers may be jeopardized by the loss of the capabilities of the crewmember who is ill. Such an occurrence will be more serious and potentially hazardous as the durations of crewed missions increase and as operational procedures become more complex. Not only do the health and safety of the crewmembers become critical, but the probability of mission success is lessened if the illness occurs during flight. Aborting a mission to return an ill crewmember before mission goals are completed is costly and potentially dangerous."  Treatment of trauma may involve surgery in zero-gravity, which is a challenging proposition given the need for blood sample containment.  Diagnosis and monitoring of crew members is a particularly vital need.  NASA tested the rHEALTH ONE to advance this capability for on-orbit, travel to Moon and Mars.  This capability is mapped to Risk of Adverse Health Outcomes and Decrements in Performance Due to Medical Conditions that occur in Mission, as well as Long Term Health Outcomes Due to Mission Exposures.  Without an approach to perform onboard medical monitoring, loss of crew members may jeopardize long duration missions.

Impact on science and medicine 

Astronauts are not the only ones who benefit from space medicine research. Several medical products have been developed that are space spinoffs, which are practical applications for the field of medicine arising out of the space program. Because of joint research efforts between NASA, the National Institutes on Aging (a part of the National Institutes of Health), and other aging-related organizations, space exploration has benefited a particular segment of society, seniors. Evidence of aging related medical research conducted in space was most publicly noticeable during STS-95. These spin-offs are sometimes termed as "exomedicine".

Pre-Mercury through Apollo 
 Radiation therapy for the treatment of cancer: In conjunction with the Cleveland Clinic, the cyclotron at Glenn Research Center in Cleveland, Ohio was used in the first clinical trials for the treatment and evaluation of neutron therapy for cancer patients.
 Foldable walkers: Made from a lightweight metal material developed by NASA for aircraft and spacecraft, foldable walkers are portable and easy to manage.
 Personal alert systems: These are emergency alert devices that can be worn by individuals who may require emergency medical or safety assistance. When a button is pushed, the device sends a signal to a remote location for help. To send the signal, the device relies on telemetry technology developed at NASA.
 CAT and MRI scans: These devices are used by hospitals to see inside the human body. Their development would not have been possible without the technology provided by NASA after it found a way to take better pictures of the Earth's moon.
 Neuromuscular Electric Stimulation (NMES): A form of treatment originally developed to combat muscle atrophy in space that has been found to have applications outside of space. A prominent example of NMES being used outside of space medicine is muscle stimulator devices for paralyzed individuals. These devices can be used from up to half an hour per day to prevent muscle atrophy in paralyzed individuals. It provides electrical stimulation to muscles which is equal to jogging three miles per week. A well-known example is that Christopher Reeve used these in his therapy. Outside of paralyzed individuals, it also has applications in sports medicine, where it is used to manage or prevent potential damages that those high-intensity lifestyles have on athletes. 
 Orthopedic evaluation tools: equipment to evaluate posture, gait and balance disturbances was developed at NASA, along with a radiation-free way to measure bone flexibility using vibration.
 Diabetic foot mapping: This technique was developed at NASA's center in Cleveland, Ohio to help monitor the effects of diabetes in feet.
 Foam cushioning: special foam used for cushioning astronauts during liftoff is used in pillows and mattresses at many nursing homes and hospitals to help prevent ulcers, relieve pressure, and provide a better night's sleep.
 Kidney dialysis machines: the Marquardt Corporation, an ancestor company with NASA, were developing a system that would purify and recycle water during space missions in the late 1960s. From this project, the Marquardt Corporation observed that these processes could be used in removing toxic waste from used dialysis fluid. This allowed the development of a kidney dialysis machine. These machines rely on technology developed by NASA in order to process and remove toxic waste from used dialysis fluid.

 Talking wheelchairs: paralyzed individuals who have difficulty speaking may use a talking feature on their wheelchairs which was developed by NASA to create synthesized speech for aircraft. "Talking Wheelchairs" or The Versatile Portable Speech Prosthesis (VSP) is a technology that aids in the communication for non-verbal persons. The project started in May 1978 and finished in November 1981. Originally, this technology was created for people who were diagnosed with cerebral palsy who were using traditional electric wheelchairs. This technology is portable and versatile, as well as a highly successful speech prosthesis. However, the nickname "talking wheelchair" has created some separation from the wheelchair itself. The VSP is easily accessible to the person using it by operation of single or multiple switches or by keyboard, and uses a synthetic voice used for verbal speech. The synthetic voice provides communication opportunities that regular speaking persons have such as: communicating with people in a crowd, communicating in the dark, communicating with people who have vision problems, communicating with younger children, communicating when the listener's back is turned, etc. The synthetic voice also provides a sense of personal and individual communication as the keyboard can be programmed with “fun” words as well as “throw-away lines”. The first version of the versatile portable speech prosthesis was completed in May 1979. There were additions made to the VSP in November 1979 and provided more controls for speech. By November 1979, VSP was capable of taking English text and successful in putting out English speech. The user was also able to store and retrieve vocabulary, as well as edit and create new vocabulary. The controls and plugs on the VSP were versatile allowing plug-and-go ability. With the limitations of ASR systems, Portable Speech Prosthesis have moved to the use of Silent Speech Recognition (SSR). The goal of using SSR with VSP is to recognize information that is speech related with some modals such as surface electromyography (sEMG). Speech recognition models used algorithms for extracting speech-related features through the sEMG signals. The patterns of sEMG signals used grammar models to recognize sequences of words. Phoneme-based models were also used when recognizing vocabulary of previously untrained words. Multi-point sensors were used with these algorithms in which they could be arranged in a flexible way to record the measurements of sEMG signals from the small articular muscles found in the human face and neck.
 Collapsible, lightweight wheelchairs: wheelchairs designed for portability that can be folded and put into trunks of cars. They rely on synthetic materials that NASA developed for its air and space craft
 Surgically implantable heart pacemaker: these devices depend on technologies developed by NASA for use with satellites. They communicate information about the activity of the pacemaker, such as how much time remains before the batteries need to be replaced.
 Implantable heart defibrillator: this tool continuously monitors heart activity and can deliver an electric shock to restore heartbeat regularity.
 EMS communications: technology used to communicate telemetry between Earth and space was developed by NASA to monitor the health of astronauts in space from the ground. Ambulances use this same technology to send information—like EKG readings—from patients in transport to hospitals. This allows faster and better treatment.
 Weightlessness therapy: The weightlessness of space can allow some individuals with limited mobility on Earth—even those normally confined to wheelchairs—the freedom to move about with ease. Physicist Stephen Hawking took advantage of weightlessness in NASA's Vomit Comet aircraft in 2007. This idea also led to the development of the Anti-Gravity Treadmill from NASA technology, which employs "differential air pressure to mimic...gravity".

Ultrasound microgravity 

The  Advanced Diagnostic Ultrasound in Microgravity Study is funded by the National Space Biomedical Research Institute and involves the use of ultrasound among Astronauts including former ISS Commanders Leroy Chiao and Gennady Padalka who are guided by remote experts to diagnose and potentially treat hundreds of medical conditions in space. This study has a widespread impact and has been extended to cover professional and Olympic sports injuries as well as medical students. It is anticipated that remote guided ultrasound will have application on Earth in emergency and rural care situations. Findings from this study were submitted for publication to the journal Radiology aboard the International Space Station; the first article submitted in space.

See also 

 Bioastronautics
 Artificial gravity
 Effect of spaceflight on the human body
 Fatigue and sleep loss during spaceflight
 Intervertebral disc damage and spaceflight
 List of microorganisms tested in outer space
 Mars analog habitat
 Medical treatment during spaceflight
 Microgravity University
 Reduced-gravity aircraft
 Renal stone formation in space
 Spaceflight osteopenia
 Spaceflight radiation carcinogenesis
 Space food
 Space nursing
 Space Nursing Society
 Team composition and cohesion in spaceflight missions
 Visual impairment due to intracranial pressure

References 
Notes

Sources

External links 
 Space Medicine Association
 Description of space medicine
 NASA History Series Publications (many of which are online)
 Sleep in Space, Digital Sleep Recorder used by NASA in STS-90 and STS-95 missions
 A Solution for Medical Needs and Cramped Quarters in Space – NASA

 
Human spaceflight programs
International Space Station experiments